The Audi Q5 e-tron is a battery electric mid-size luxury crossover SUV with three-row seating produced by Audi through the SAIC-VW joint venture in China. Based on the MEB platform, it is the fifth battery electric model in the Audi e-tron series. Closely related to the Q4 e-tron, the model is regarded as the Audi equivalent of the similarly-sized Volkswagen ID.6, and not mechanically related to the Audi Q5 or the Q8 e-tron which use the MLB platform.

Overview 

The Q5 e-tron was revealed at the 2021 Guangzhou Auto Show as the first three-row model of the e-tron series, and the ninth model that is based on the MEB platform. While sporting a separate exterior design, dashboard design is derived from the Q4 e-tron, with a 10.25-inch digital instrument cluster and an 11.6-inch infotainment touchscreen.

Two variants are offered, which are the Q5 40 e-tron and Q5 50 e-tron quattro. It is available with a 83.4 kWh battery.

References

Q5 e-tron
Production electric cars
Luxury crossover sport utility vehicles
Mid-size sport utility vehicles
Rear-wheel-drive vehicles
All-wheel-drive vehicles
Cars introduced in 2021